Julia Ingrid Lane is an economist and economic statistician who works as a professor at New York University's Wagner Graduate School of Public Service, as well as NYU's Center for Urban Science and Progress, helping CUSP to build CUSP data facility. Also, she works in NYU’s GovLab as a Provostial Fellow for Innovation Analytics and Senior Fellow.

Education and career
Lane has triple citizenship in the United States, the United Kingdom, and New Zealand. She earned a bachelor's degree from Massey University in New Zealand in 1977, studying economics and the Japanese language, and then came to the University of Missouri for graduate study. She completed a master's degree in statistics with a minor in mathematics, and a Ph.D. in economics with a minor in German, both in 1982.

She joined the faculty of Western Illinois University in 1982, and moved to the University of Louisville in 1983. She moved again to American University in 1990, taking a temporary drop in rank to assistant professor in the move; while at American University, beginning in 1992, she also began consulting with the Education and Social Policy and Private Sector Development units of the World Bank. In 2000 she took a position as Director and Principal Research Associate at the Urban Institute and in 2004 she became a Program Director for Economics at the National Science Foundation. From 2005 to 2008 she was Senior Vice President at NORC at the University of Chicago, and from 2008 to 2012 she returned to the National Science Foundation as a Senior Program Director. From 2012 to 2015 she worked at the American Institutes for Research, and since 2015 she has been affiliated with New York University. There, she is Professor of Public Service in the Robert F. Wagner Graduate School of Public Service, Professor of the Practice in the Center for Urban Science and Progress, and Provostial Fellow for Innovation Analytics.

Awards and honors
Lane has been a Fellow of the American Statistical Association (ASA) since 2009. She is also a fellow of the Society for Economic Measurement and the American Association for the Advancement of Science, and an elected member of the International Statistical Institute.

She has received over $50 million in grants, from many foundations such as National Science Foundation, the Alfred P. Sloan Foundation, the Ewing Marion Kauffman Foundation, the MacArthur Foundation, the Russell Sage Foundation, the Spencer Foundation, the National Institutes of Health and from different governments. 

She won the ASA's Julius Shiskin Memorial Award for Economic Statistics in 2014. In the same year, she won the Roger Herriot award. "for her contributions to the development of a new Census Bureau program that has significantly advanced research on employment dynamics", and in the same year also won the ASA's Roger Herriot Award for the same census project.

In 2017, the Inter-university Consortium for Political and Social Research gave Lane their Warren E. Miller Award for Meritorious Service to the Social Sciences.

Books
Lane has published over 70 articles in leading economic journals and published or edited over 10 books.
Lane is the author of four books:
Moving Up or Moving On: Workers, Firms and Advancement in the Low-Wage Labor Market (with Fredrik Andersson and Harry J. Holzer, Sage Press, 2005)

Where Are All The Good Jobs Going? What National And Local Job Quality And Dynamics Mean For U.S. Workers (with Harry J. Holzer and David Rosenblum, Russell Sage Press, 2011)
Democratizing Our Data: A Manifesto (MIT Press, 2020), ISBN 0262359707, 9780262359702

References

External links
Home page

American statisticians
American University faculty and staff
American women economists
British statisticians
British women economists
Elected Members of the International Statistical Institute
Fellows of the American Association for the Advancement of Science
Fellows of the American Statistical Association
Living people
Massey University alumni
New York University faculty
New Zealand economists
New Zealand statisticians
University of Louisville faculty
University of Missouri alumni
Western Illinois University faculty
Women statisticians
Year of birth missing (living people)
21st-century American women